Maria Andreevna Komarova (born April 24, 1998 in Saint Petersburg) is a Russian female curler. She currently plays third on Team Alina Kovaleva.

Teams and events

Women's

Mixed

Mixed doubles

References

External links

Curling World Cup profile

Living people
1998 births
Curlers from Saint Petersburg
Russian female curlers

Universiade medalists in curling
Universiade bronze medalists for Russia
Competitors at the 2019 Winter Universiade
Curlers at the 2022 Winter Olympics
Olympic curlers of Russia